The 1941 Copa Ibarguren was the 18th edition of the national cup of Argentina. The final was played by the champions of both leagues, River Plate (Primera División), and Newell's Old Boys (Liga Rosarina de Football), both crowned during the 1941 seasons. The reserve squad of Newell's Old Boys was fielded for the match.

Managed by Renato Cesarini, River Plate beat Newell's 3–0 at Ferro Carril Oeste Stadium, winning their 2nd Copa Ibarguren title.

Qualified teams

Match details

References 

i
i
1941 in Argentine football
1941 in South American football